Deda mac Sin (Deda, son of Sen) was a prehistoric king of the Érainn of Ireland, possibly of the 1st century BC. Variant forms or spellings include Ded, Dedu, Dedad, Degad, Dega, Dego, Deguth and Daig, with some of these occurring as genitives although usage is entirely unsystematic, besides the rare occurrence of the obvious genitive Dedaid. He is the eponymous ancestor of the Clanna Dedad, and may also have been a King of Munster.

Through his sons Íar mac Dedad and Dáire mac Dedad, Dedu is an ancestor of many famous figures from legendary Ireland, including his "grandsons" (giving or taking a generation) Cú Roí mac Dáire and Eterscél, "great-grandsons" (again) Conaire Mór and Lugaid mac Con Roí, and more distant descendant Conaire Cóem. A third son was Conganchnes mac Dedad. Through these Dedu is also an ancestor of several historical peoples of both Ireland and Scotland, including the Dál Riata, Dal Fiatach, Múscraige, Corcu Duibne, and Corcu Baiscind, all said to belong to the Érainn (Iverni), of whom the Clanna Dedad appear to have been a principal royal sept.

The generations preceding Dedu mac Sin in the extant pedigrees appear artificial. Eventually they lead through Ailill Érann to a descent from Óengus Tuirmech Temrach and thus a distant kinship with the Connachta and Uí Néill, whose own pedigree is in fact unreliable before Túathal Techtmar.

A proto-historical sept of the Clanna Dedad are known as the Dáirine, descending from Dáire mac Dedad and/or Dáire Doimthech (Sírchrechtach), and are later known as the Corcu Loígde. Alternatively this may be used synonymously, with some confusion created by their identification with the Darini of prehistoric Ulster. In any case, the Darini and Iverni are clearly related.

According to the Book of Glendalough (Rawlinson B 502) and Laud 610 pedigrees, a brother of Dedu was Eochaid/Echdach mac Sin, from whom descend the Dál Fiatach of Ulster. But alternatively they descend directly from Cú Roí mac Dáire, and thus from the Clanna Dedad proper. The precise relation of the Dál Fiatach to the Ulaid of the Ulster Cycle, rivals of the Clanna Dedad, is lost to history.

Eoin MacNeill finds the Conaille Muirtheimne to also descend from Dedu mac Sin, from another son Conall Anglonnach, believing they are quite mistakenly thought to be Cruthin, as found in later genealogies.

Dui Dallta Dedad was a foster-son of Dedu.

There is also an Ogham of Dedu (Ogam Dedad) found in the Book of Ogams. Over one third of all Irish ogham inscriptions are found in the lands of his descendants the Corcu Duibne.

The Sil Conairi

The Síl Conairi were those septs of the Clanna Dedad descended from Conaire Mór, namely the Dál Riata, Múscraige, Corcu Duibne, and Corcu Baiscinn. The first, presumably settling in far northeastern Ulster in the prehistoric period, would famously go on to found the Kingdom of Scotland. The Royal Family of Scotland, the House of Dunkeld, were described as the "seed of Conaire Mór" as late as the twelfth century. Through the House of Dunkeld and Conaire Mór, Dedu mac Sin is an ancestor of the modern British royal family. The last king in the direct male line from the Clanna Dedad and Sil Conairi was Alexander III of Scotland (d. 19 March 1286).

The remaining Síl Conaire would settle and/or remain in Munster, where, although retaining their distinctive identity, they would be overshadowed first by their Dáirine (Corcu Loígde) kinsmen, and later fall under the sovereignty of the Eóganachta. But it appears the Síl Conaire, and especially the Múscraige, actually acted as prominent facilitators for the latter, and this would presumably have been in opposition to the Dáirine. A late and unexpected king of Munster from the Múscraige was Flaithbertach mac Inmainén (d. 944).

The birth, life, and fall of Conaire Mór are recounted in the epic tale Togail Bruidne Dá Derga. Two distantly related tales of more interest to genealogists are De Síl Chonairi Móir  and De Maccaib Conaire. In these he is confused with his descendant Conaire Cóem.

The Dál Fiatach and Cú Roí

The descent of the Dál Fiatach princes of Ulster from Dedu mac Sin is less secure, but nonetheless is supported by independent medieval sources (and contradicted by others).

The Dáirine (Corcu Loígde)

As early as 1849, the great Irish scholar John O'Donovan noted that the pedigree of the Corcu Loígde, the leading historical descendants of the Dáirine, is corrupt for many of the generations preceding the legendary monarch Lugaid Mac Con.

Descent of the Clanna Dedad
Skipped generations are given in the notes.

 Sen mac Rosin
 Dedu mac Sin a quo Clanna Dedad
 Íar mac Dedad
 Ailill Anglonnach
 Éogan 
 Eterscél
 Conaire Mór a quo Síl Conaire
 Mug Láma
 Conaire Cóem
 Eochaid (Cairpre) Riata (Rigfhota), a quo
 Dál Riata
 Erc of Dalriada
 Fergus Mór
 Domangart Réti
 Gabrán mac Domangairt, a quo
 Cenél nGabráin
 House of Alpin
 House of Dunkeld
 Comgall mac Domangairt, a quo
 Cenél Comgaill
 Loarn mac Eirc, a quo
 Cenél Loairn
 House of Moray
 Mormaers of Moray
 Óengus Mór mac Eirc, a quo
 Cenél nÓengusa
 Cairpre Músc, a quo
 Múscraige
 Corc Duibne, a quo
 Corcu Duibne
 Cairpre Baschaín, a quo
 Corcu Baiscind
 Dáire mac Dedad / Dairi Sirchrechtaig / Dáire Doimthech
  Cú Roí mac Dáire
 Lugaid mac Con Roí
 Fuirme mac Con Roí 
 (F)Iatach Find, a quo
 Dál Fiatach
 Dáirine
 Corcu Loígde 
 Conganchnes mac Dedad
 Conall Anglonnach mac Dedad, a quo
 Conaille Muirtheimne
 Eochaid (Echdach/Echach) mac Sin 
 Deitsin/Deitsini
 Dlúthaich/Dluthaig
 Dáire/Dairi
 Fir furmi 
 Fiatach Finn / Fiachach Fir Umai 
 Dál Fiatach

Notes

References

 John Bannerman, Studies in the History of Dalriada. Edinburgh: Scottish Academic Press. 1974
 Francis John Byrne, Irish Kings and High-Kings. Four Courts Press. 2nd revised edition, 2001.
 Hector Munro Chadwick, Early Scotland: the Picts, the Scots and the Welsh of southern Scotland. Cambridge University Press. 1949.
 Margaret E. Dobbs, The History of the Descendants of Ir, in Zeitschrift für celtische Philologie 13 (1921): 308–59; continued in Zeitschrift für celtische Philologie 14 (1923): 44–144.
 Margaret E. Dobbs, Side-lights on the Táin age and other studies. Dundalk: WM. Tempest. 1917.
 John V. Kelleher, "The Pre-Norman Irish genealogies", in Irish Historical Studies 16, No. 62  (1968): 138–153.
 John V. Kelleher, "The Táin and the Annals", in Ériu 22 (1971): 107–27
Eoin MacNeill, "Early Irish Population Groups: their nomenclature, classification and chronology", in Proceedings of the Royal Irish Academy (C) 29 (1911): 59–114
 Eoin MacNeill. "Notes on Irish Ogham Inscriptions", in Proceedings of the Royal Irish Academy. 1909. pp. 329–70
 Kuno Meyer (ed.), "The Laud Genealogies and Tribal Histories", in Zeitschrift für celtische Philologie 8 (1912): 291–338.
 Michael A. O'Brien (ed.) with intr. by John V. Kelleher, Corpus genealogiarum Hiberniae. DIAS. 1976. / partial digital edition: Donnchadh Ó Corráin (ed.), Genealogies from Rawlinson B 502. University College, Cork: Corpus of Electronic Texts. 1997.
 John O'Donovan (ed. & tr.), "The Genealogy of Corca Laidhe", in Miscellany of the Celtic Society. Dublin: Printed for The Celtic Society. 1849. alternative scan
 T. F. O'Rahilly, Early Irish History and Mythology. Dublin Institute for Advanced Studies. 1946.
 Julius Pokorny, "Beiträge zur ältesten Geschichte Irlands (3. Érainn, Dári(n)ne und die Iverni und Darini des Ptolomäus)", in Zeitschrift für celtische Philologie 12 (1918): 323–57.

Dictionary of the Irish Language
 eDIL – Dictionary of the Irish Language Letter: D1 (D-Degóir), Columns 207 & 208

Ireland's History in Maps
 Ulidia by Dennis Walsh
 Mumu by Dennis Walsh

Legendary Irish kings
Scottish clans